László Bárczay (21 February 1936 – 7 April 2016) was a Hungarian chess Grandmaster.

In 1966 he was awarded the FIDE International Master title. At the 1966 Olympiad in Havana, he scored 11/12 (ten wins and two draws) as second reserve for the bronze medal-winning Hungarian team, winning the individual gold medal for sixth board. In 1967 he was awarded the Grandmaster title.

Other tournament successes include:
 Asztalos Memorial in Salgótarján, 1967 – 1st= 
 Zonal Tournament in Vrnjačka Banja, 1967 – 3rd 
 Sarajevo, 1968 – 1st=
 Polanica-Zdrój, 1969 – 1st
 Bari, 1970 – 2nd
 Lublin, 1975 – 2nd
 Astor, 1982 – 1st

From 1972 to 1976 he was the editor of the Magyar Sakkélet. During this time he took up correspondence chess, and was awarded the ICCF International Master title in 1973. Bárczay earned the ICCF Grandmaster title in 1979 after finishing equal first in the  Vidmar memorial tournament between 1975 and 1979.

References

External links 
 
 
 

1936 births
2016 deaths
Chess grandmasters
Chess double grandmasters
Hungarian chess players
Correspondence chess grandmasters
Chess Olympiad competitors
People from Miskolc